1997 Kyoto Purple Sanga season

Competitions

Domestic results

J.League

Emperor's Cup

J.League Cup

Player statistics

 † player(s) joined the team after the opening of this season.

Transfers

In:

Out:

Transfers during the season

In
Daniel (on April)
Yuki Hara
Nobuhiro Takeda (from Verdy Kawasaki)
Masaki Ogawa (from Kashima Antlers)
Shigetatsu Matsunaga (from Brummel Sendai)
Mineiro (on September)

Out
Edmílson (on February)
Cléber (on July)
Ruy Ramos (to Verdy Kawasaki)

Awards
none

References
J.LEAGUE OFFICIAL GUIDE 1997, 1997 
J.LEAGUE OFFICIAL GUIDE 1998, 1996 
J.LEAGUE YEARBOOK 1999, 1999

Other pages
 J. League official site
 Kyoto Sanga F.C. official site

Kyoto Purple Sanga
Kyoto Sanga FC seasons